Macarostola pyrelictis is a moth of the family Gracillariidae. It is known from Samoa.

References

Macarostola
Moths described in 1927